Mason is an unincorporated community in Grant County, Kentucky, United States. Mason has a post office with ZIP code 41054, which opened on July 26, 1855.

References

Unincorporated communities in Grant County, Kentucky
Unincorporated communities in Kentucky